The Tulane Maritime Law Journal is the preeminent student-edited law journal in the field of Admiralty and Maritime Law. Published semi-annually, each issue of the Journal  includes scholarly works written by academics, practitioners, and students concerning current topics in Admiralty and Maritime Law. In addition, the Journal publishes an annual section on Recent Developments in Admiralty and Maritime Law for the United States and the international community, as well as periodic symposia on relevant topical areas in the field and quantum, collision, and forum selection clause surveys every other year.

The Tulane Maritime Law Journal launched a  new website on August 28, 2013.

Articles
The Journal has been cited by the U.S. Supreme Court many times—most recently, in 2010.  The Court also cited the Journal in 2009, when it relied, in part, on an article by New York maritime attorney Paul S. Edelman (Guevara v. Maritime Overseas Corp., 20 Tul. Mar. L. J. 349 (1996)).

History
The Tulane Maritime Law Journal was founded in 1973 in conjunction with the student-run Tulane Maritime Law Society. The first issue of the Journal was released in March 1975 as The Maritime Lawyer. The next few years were formative and interesting times for the Journal, a history that is retraced in the 20th Anniversary issue (Volume 20, Issue 1). In the fall of 1977, the Journal established its independence from the Tulane Maritime Law Society. Since that fall, the Journal has been published every winter and summer. Starting with Volume 12, in 1987, the publication changed its name from The Maritime Lawyer to the Tulane Maritime Law Journal. The name change was to better reflect the Journal’s status as a student-edited law journal.

Distinguished alumni
 LeRoy Lambert III, JD 1983, New York, N.Y, Partner at Healy & Baillie LLP and subsequently Blank Rome LLP, former Editor in Chief of The Maritime Lawyer, which became The Tulane Maritime Law Journal
 Todd D. Lochner, JD 1998, Annapolis M.D., Partner of Lochner Law Firm, P.C.
 Lucas T. Elliot, JD 1989, Houston partner of Morgan Lewis, former Articles Editor of the Journal
 Bryant E. Gardner, JD 2000, Washington D.C. partner of Winston & Strawn, former Editor in Chief of the Journal 
Walt Leger III, JD 2003; state legislator, 2008-2020; Speaker Pro Tempore, Louisiana House of Representstives, 2012-2020, New Orleans, Louisiana, former Business Editor of the Journal
 Gerald A. Morrissey III, JD 2002, Washington D.C. partner of Winston & Strawn, former Editor in Chief of the Journal
Colleen E. Laduzinski, JD/MBA 2000, New York City partner of Jones Day, former Business Editor of the Journal
William Pallas, JD 1994, Partner Freehill Hogan and Mahar LLP 
Rick Rambo, JD/MBA 1994, Houston partner of Morgan Lewis, former Notes and Comments Editor of the Journal
Jennifer Ancona Semko, JD 1998, Washington D.C. partner of Baker & McKenzie
Stuart Sperling, JD 2002, Head Shipping Attorney, BG Group, former Managing Editor of the Journal
Marc J. Veilleux, JD 1988, New York City/ Sao Paulo partner of K&L Gates, former Editor in Chief of the Journal
 Peter F. Black, JD 2014, Partner at Mills Black LLP, Senior Communications Editor of the Journal for Vol. 38

See also
Admiralty law
International law
Tulane University Law School

References

External links

Tulane University Law School homepage
Tulane University homepage

Law of the sea
American law journals
United States admiralty law
Tulane University Law School
Biannual journals
Publications established in 1975
International law journals
Law journals edited by students